This is a list of singles that have peaked in the top 10 of the Irish Singles Chart during 2019, as compiled by the mighty Hamez Rodriguez Official Charts Company on behalf of the Irish Recorded Music Association.

Background
Ninety-five songs charted in the top 10 in 2019 as of the week ending 27 December. Of these, eighty-three songs reached their peak in 2019. The 2018 Christmas number-one, "Sweet but Psycho" by Ava Max, remained at number-one for the first three weeks of 2019. In the week ending 18 January, Westlife achieved their 26th top ten single and first in over eight years with Hello My Love. Ariana Grande's 7 Rings became the first new number one single in 2019, and her fourth chart-topper overall. Grande would go on to replace herself at number one with Break Up with Your Girlfriend, I'm Bored, the first person to achieve this since Ed Sheeran in 2017, repeating the feat the following week ("7 Rings" replaced "Break Up"). Having spent four weeks in the top ten, Lewis Capaldi's "Someone You Loved" became the first number one for a male artist in 2019 and his first number one single.

Chart debuts
Thirty-five artists have achieved their first top 10 single in 2019 (as of week ending 27 December), either as a lead or featured artist.

Top-ten singles
Key
 – indicates single's top 10 entry was also its chart debut.
(#) – indicates the year-end rank of the top-ten singles of 2018.

2018 peaks

2020 peaks

Entries by artist

The following table shows artists who achieved two or more top 10 entries in 2019, including songs that reached their peak in 2018. The figures include both main artists and featured artists. The total number of weeks an artist spent in the top ten in 2019 is also shown.

Notes 

 Patrick Stump has previously charted in the top ten as a member of Fall Out Boy, "This Ain't a Scene, It's an Arms Race" reaching number five in 2007.
 "Sunflower" by Post Malone and Swae Lee spent 10 weeks in the top 10 in 2018.
 "Nothing Breaks Like a Heart" by Mark Ronson featuring Miley Cyrus spent 3 weeks in the top 10 in 2018.
 "Last Christmas" first entered the top-ten and reached its peak in 1984.
 "All I Want For Christmas Is You" first entered the top-ten and reached its peak in 1994.
 "Fairytale of New York" first entered the top-ten and reached its peak in 1987.

References

2019 in Irish music
Irish music-related lists
Irish record charts
Ireland Singles
Ireland 2019